is a Japanese manga series written and illustrated by Kōji Kumeta. It has been serialized in Shogakukan's shōnen manga magazine Weekly Shōnen Sunday since October 2021.

Publication
Written and illustrated by Kōji Kumeta, Shibuya Near Family started in Shogakukan's shōnen manga magazine Weekly Shōnen Sunday on October 27, 2021. Shogakukan released the first tankōbon volume on September 15, 2022.

Volume list

References

External links
  

Comedy anime and manga
Kōji Kumeta
Shogakukan manga
Shōnen manga
Slice of life anime and manga